"Speech Sounds"  is a science fiction short story by American writer Octavia E. Butler. It was first published in Asimov's Science Fiction Magazine in 1983. It won Butler her first Hugo Award for Best Short Story in 1984. The story was subsequently collected in Butler's anthology Bloodchild and Other Stories and in the science fiction anthology Wastelands: Stories of the Apocalypse.

Plot summary
A mysterious pandemic leaves civilization in ruins and severely limits humankind's ability to communicate. Some are deprived of their ability to read or write, while others lose the ability to speak. They identify themselves by carrying items or symbols that function as names.  People communicate among themselves through universally understood  sign language and gestures that can often exacerbate misunderstandings and conflicts. Additionally, it seems that as a result of the illness and their handicap, many ordinary people are easily prone to uncontrollable feelings of jealousy, resentment, and rage over their own impairments and the ability of others.

In Los Angeles, a woman named Rye has lost her parents, husband, sister and children to the illness. Due to this isolation, she decides to seek out her brother and his family in nearby Pasadena. They are her only remaining relatives, although she is unsure if they have survived. When a fight breaks out on a bus, Rye is forced to consider walking the rest of the twenty miles through dangerous territory. She then meets Obsidian, a man dressed in an LAPD uniform, an oddity in a society in which all governmental organizations have disintegrated. He stops to restore order, ending the fight by throwing an object which releases gas into the bus, causing everyone to exit and the fight to end. He then offers her a ride in his car. She initially refuses the offer of a ride, noting the gun he owns and fearing his intentions. However, he gestures persistently and removes his revolver to indicate he doesn't intend to harm her. Confronted with the hostilities of her fellow passengers or the threat of walking the streets alone, she cautiously accepts the stranger's offer, and together they resume the trip out of the city. Before long, Rye learns that Obsidian can still read a map, and she struggles with an intense feeling of jealousy and an urge to kill him. Instead, she reveals that she is still able to talk, and the two share an intimate moment and have sex. Rye asks Obsidian to return home with her, and he reluctantly agrees.

On the road home, the couple observes a woman being chased by a man wielding a knife. Both feel inclined to intervene in the woman's defense but are unable to prevent the woman from being fatally stabbed.  After wounding the assailant, the man is able to wrestle the gun from Obsidian and shoot him in the head, which instantly kills him. Rye then kills the assailant. After the violence, two children emerge, a boy and a younger girl, apparently the children of the dead woman. Rye drags Obsidian back to the car with the intention of giving him a proper burial—and initially plans to ignore the plight of the children—but shortly afterward, she has a change of heart and returns for the body of the woman and her two children. As she reaches for the woman's body, the girl speaks in coherent English, shouting "No. Go Away," and the young boy tells her not to speak. This is the first coherent speech that Rye has heard in many years, and she realizes that her choice to adopt the children is the right one. "I’m Valerie Rye," she says. "It‘s all right for you to talk to me." It is the first time she has spoken her own name in a very long time.

Themes 
Communication

Everyone has to use symbols that represent their name as forms of identification. Rye uses a pin in the shape of a stalk of wheat (the closest thing to "rye") and Obsidian uses a black rock. We learn that "Rye" is actually our protagonist's last name; her first name is Valerie. Rye going by just her last name represents the limitations of communication in society. We also do not know if "Obsidian" is actually his name; Rye assumes it from the black rock token he shows her. The limited nonverbal communication present in society has most people harboring intense feelings of jealousy, rage, and aggression. The fight on the bus was initiated by one wrong look. There is even an hierarchical aspect in the abilities still retained among everyone; left-handed people are seen as more intellectual, and less prone to aggression and irrationality.

The entire story is guided by gestures, from the mock throwing of punches between the men on the bus to Obsidian's gentle touch with Rye in the car. Rye notices Obsidian frequently motioning with his left hand, a sign that he has retained some intellect. The male passengers on the bus, with obvious lesser abilities, do mostly obscene gestures in the first half of the story, a lot of which now represent the new society's versions of curse words.

Survival

The decline in intellectual ability has left everyone to fend for themselves in the post-apocalyptic society. Rye carries a gun with her at all times for this reason. Rye has learned to be a quick thinker, knowing exactly what to do when the fight on the bus breaks out, like stopping herself from getting hurt and getting off the bus as soon as she could. Any sense of normalcy and protection has diminished; any sort of transportation can be used as weapons (hence the lack of cars and Rye's surprise when a bus turned up), and organizations such as the LAPD have ceased to exist. When she first encounters Obsidian, an LAPD officer still in uniform, she was wary of his intentions, fearing he might harm her. The children Rye saves at the end of the story have also learned to protect themselves at a young age. When Rye attempts to retrieve the body of the women, the sister of the pair tells her "No! Go away!," and the brother reprimands her for speaking out loud to a stranger; he is aware that if people know they can speak, they can be in serious danger.

References

External links

Science fiction short stories
1983 short stories
Hugo Award for Best Short Story winning works
Works originally published in Asimov's Science Fiction
Works by Octavia Butler
1980s science fiction works